The 1980 World Cup took place 11–14 December 1980 at the El Rincon Golf Club in Bogotá, Colombia. It was the 28th World Cup event. The tournament was a 72-hole stroke play team event with 45 teams. Each team consisted of two players from a country. 50 countries originally entered the four-day competition, but Jamaica, Uruguay and the Dominican Republic all withdrew shortly before the start. The team from the Netherlands quit the tournament when one of its players became ill. The combined score of each team determined the team results. A notable player withdrawal, before the tournament begun, was  Seve Ballesteros, who was selected to the Spanish team and took part in the Colombian Open on a nearby course the week before, but, reportedly due to his demand of appearance money being denied, didn't  play in the World Cup. The Canadian team of Dan Halldorson and Jim Nelford won by three strokes over the Scotland team of Sandy Lyle and Steve Martin. The individual competition for the International Trophy, was won by Lyle one stroke ahead of Bernhard Langer, West Germany.

Teams 

(a) - denotes amateur

Scores
Team

International Trophy

Sources:

References

World Cup (men's golf)
Golf tournaments in Colombia
Sports competitions in Bogotá
World Cup golf
World Cup golf
World Cup golf